Malay Singaporeans are a local ethnic group in Singapore. The group is defined as a Singaporean who is of Malay ethnicity or, whose ancestry originates from the Malay world. Malay Singaporeans constitute approximately 15% of the country's citizens, making them the second largest ethnic group in Singapore after Chinese Singaporeans and before Indian Singaporeans. They are recognised by the government as an indigenous people of the country. 

At the time of the arrival of British colonial official Stamford Raffles in 1819, the Malays constituted a higher percentage living on the island. From the 19th century until World War II, the Malays enjoyed favourable treatment and disproportionate employment to colonial governmental posts; this was concurrent with a sharp increase in the Malay population due to immigration to Singapore from the other parts of the region.

Today, Malay Singaporeans often come from various backgrounds in the Malay world, though many are nonetheless tied together by a similar culture, customs, language and religion as Singaporeans. Singaporean Malays are active in all spheres of Singaporean culture and society, with independent representation in areas such as media, politics and sport, among others.

History of the Malay kings of Singapore

The seventeenth-century Malay chronicle, the Sejarah Melayu or Malay Annals, tells of the founding of a great trading city on the island of Temasek in 1299 AD by a prince from Palembang. Palembang was then the capital of the diminishing Srivijaya Empire. The prince, Sri Tri Buana, (also known as Sang Nila Utama) was said to be a descendant of Alexander the Great and an Indian princess called Shahru Al-Bariyah. Legend states that he renamed the city Singapura ("lion city") after sighting a strange beast that he took to be a lion, although there is no real historical evidence of this.

In the mid-14th century, Singapura suffered raids by the expanding Javanese Majapahit Empire to the south and the emerging Thai kingdom of Ayutthaya to the north, both claiming the island as a vassal state at several points in time. Around 1388, the ruler of Palembang, Parameswara, came to Singapore to flee from Majapahit control. He murdered the king and seized power, but it was a futile act. The Srivijaya Empire, already in decline, finally met its end when Majapahit attacked its capital Palembang in 1391. In 1396, Majapahit or Ayutthaya forces drove out Parameswara, who fled northward and founded kingdom of Malacca in 1400.

When the Portuguese captured Malacca in 1511, the last Malaccan sultan, Mahmud Shah, fled to Johore, where he established the new Johore Sultanate. Singapura became part of this sultanate. In 1613, however, the Portuguese reportedly burning down a trading outpost at the mouth of the river and Singapura passed into history.

The territory controlled by the Johore Riau Lingga Pahang Sultanate in the late eighteenth century still included Singapore as part of its territory. The sultanate had become increasingly weakened by a division into a Malay faction, which controlled the peninsula and Singapore and a Bugis faction which controlled the Riau Archipelago and Sumatra. When Sultan Mahmud Riayat Shah III died in 1811, the Bugis had proclaimed the younger of his two sons, Abdul Rahman, as sultan instead of the elder son, Tengku Long. While the sultan was the nominal ruler of his domain, senior officials actually governed the sultanate. In control of Singapore and the neighbouring islands was Temenggong Abdul Rahman, Tengku Long's father-in-law. In 1818, he and some of his followers left Riau for Singapore shortly after the Dutch signed a treaty with the Sultan Abdul Rahman, allowing the Dutch to station a garrison at Riau.

In 1819, Tengku Long signed a treaty with the British led by Sir Stamford Raffles. In exchange for British protection and recognising him as Sultan of Johor, Tengku Long agreed to allow the British to establish a trading post in Singapore. Proclaimed as Sultan Hussein Shah, he became the Sultan of Johore. Hussein Shah's claim to be Sultan of Johor and Singapore was by all accounts not recognised by the Malay rulers and was only a nominal title. Sultan Hussein on his part, did not pursue any active claim to his sovereignty rights over Johor, spent much of his time at his residence in Istana Kampong Glam until he moved to Malacca in 1834.

In 1835, Sultan Hussein Shah died and was succeeded by his eldest son, Tengku Ali. In 1855, due to his debts caused by his extravagant lifestyle, Sultan Ali formally ceded his sovereignty rights of Johor to Temenggong Daeng Ibrahim with the exception of the Kesang territory in Muar, plus an annual stipend for his family. Thus, Temenggong Daeng Ibrahim was made the de facto Maharajah of Johor until his death in 1862. He was succeed by his son Abu Bakar, who eventually went on to become the Sultan of modern Johor in 1886.

After Sultan Ali's death in 1877, disputes broke out among his descendants. In the late 1890s, they went to court, where it was decided that no one in the family had the rights as the successor to the sultanate and the land at Kampong Glam should revert to the state [Tengku Mahmud vs. Tengku Ali, Straits Settlements Laws Report 1897 (Vol. 5)].

Malay kings of Singapore (1299–1396 AD)
 Sri Tri Buana (Sang Nila Utama) (1299–1347)
 Raja Kecil Besar (Paduka Seri Wikrama Wira) (1348–1362 (?) )
 Raja Muda (Paduka Seri Rana Wikrama) (1363–1374 (?) )
 Damia Raja (Paduka Seri Maharaja) (1375–1386 (?) )
 Parameswara (Paduka Seri Iskandar Shah) (1388 or 1390 (?) –1397)

Malay kings of Singapore (1699–1835 AD)
 Bendahara Sultan Abdul Jalil Riayat Shah IV (Sultan of Riau-Lingga-Pahang) (1699–1718)
 Abdul Jalil Rahmat Shah (Raja Kecil) (Sultan of Riau-Lingga-Pahang) (1718–1722)
 Sultan Sulaiman Badrul Al-Alam Shah (Sultan of Johore-Riau-Lingga-Pahang) (1722–1760)
 Sultan Mahmud Riayat Shah III (Sultan of Johore-Pahang) (1761–1812)
 Sultan Abdul Rahman (Sultan of Lingga) (1812–1832) (Placed on the throne instead of his older brother Hussein, supported by Bugis.)
 Sultan Hussein Shah (Sultan of Johor) (1819–1835) (Recognised by the British as the rightful Sultan of Johore.)

Migration of Malays to Singapore after 1819

When Raffles arrived in Singapore, there were already thousands of indigenous Malays living there. The waters of Telok Blangah, the Kallang River and other rivers had been home to the Orang Laut or Sea Nomads for a very long time. There were also Malay settlements along the Kallang River Basin and the Singapore River. Turnbull reported that there was an estimated 1,000 people living in Singapore. There were about 500 Orang Kallang, 200 Orang Seletar, 150 Orang Gelam, 100 Orang Lauts, 20–30 Malays who were the followers of Temenggong Abdul Rahman.

In the first census taken in 1824, it was revealed that the Malays (including the Bugis) then made up 60.9 per cent of the total population of 10,683. The 1826 census shows 4,790 Malays, 1,242 Bugis, and 267 Javanese out of a total population 13,750.

Malay subgroups

Most Singaporean Malays are descended from different ethnic groups that are found throughout the Malay Archipelago. Most notable are the Orang Laut and Malays (the original inhabitants of Singapore), Javanese, Boyanese, Bugis, Minangkabaus, Banjarese and the Bataks.

The Orang Laut (Sea Nomads)
Also known as Orang Pulau/Orang Singapura

According to Sopher (1977), the Orang Kallang, Orang Seletar, Orang Selat and Orang Gelam were the Orang Laut that lived in Singapore. The Orang Kallang (also called the Orang Biduanda Kallang) lived in the swampy areas in the Kallang River. They lived on boats and sustained their lives by fishing and collecting other materials from the forests. After 1819, they were relocated by Temenggong Abdul Rahman to the northern Singapore Straits at Sungai Pulau. In 1847 most of the Orang Kallang were wiped out by a smallpox epidemic.

The Orang Seletar lived in the river swamps and the small islands surrounding mainland Singapore. They would often gather in the coastal areas, especially on the estuary of the Seletar River. They lived a nomadic lifestyle until the 1850s when they started living on land and followed the lifestyles of others living in Singapore.

The Orang Seletar lived in the harbour waters of Keppel Singapore. They were believed to have traversed the waters of Keppel Harbour since the early 16th century, making them one of the earliest settlers of the island. They sold fish and fruits to the trading vessels that passed the area.

The Orang Gelam came from a tribe in Batam Island. They were brought by the Temenggong of Johor together with a group of his followers to establish a settlement in the first decade of the 19th century. Many of the Orang Gelam who lived along the Singapore River served as boatmen for merchant ships while their womenfolk were fruit sellers on boats.

The Orang Laut differed from the Malays in that they lived a nomadic lifestyle and lived at sea in their boats whereas the Malays lived in settlements in the villages on the land. One example of an Orang Laut is Mohammed Abdul Rahmah.

The Malays Proper (Johor-Riau)

When Raffles came to Singapore, there were already hundreds of indigenous Malays and orang laut living there. They were made up of the nobility that was headed by the Temenggong, the palace officials and his followers as well as the Orang Laut. Subsequently, the numbers increased with the arrivals of other Malays from Malaya and the Malay Archipelago.

In a matter of several months, hundreds of Malays from Malacca came to Singapore, encouraged by the British who wanted to develop Singapore as a centre for trade and administration (Siebel, 1961:27). When Singapore became more developed and there were better economic opportunities, many Malays from Johore, Riau Islands, Sumatra, Penang and Malacca came to Singapore (Roff, 1967:33; Census 1931:72). Many of these Malays lived in the towns and worked there (Siebel, 1961:35). The census for 1931 showed that the total number of Malay men working here were as many as 11,290. Out of this number, 18% worked as fishermen and as many as 12% lived by farming the land.

In the 1930s and 1950s, many Malay residents from Malaya were working in the British uniformed services. In 1957 alone, there were more than 10,000 Malays working in the uniform services because the British preferred them to the Javanese or Malays from Indonesia (Betts, 1975:41; Djamour, 1959:5). However, during the period 1957–1970, most of them returned to Malaysia when their terms of services ended.

The Javanese
The second-largest Malay group were the Javanese. They came from Java in the Dutch East Indies (modern Indonesia). In the 1931 Population Census, the number of Javanese in Singapore was 16,063. The 1981 Population Census, however, showed that they made up 6% of the Malay population. However, many Javanese had actually registered themselves as 'Malay'. It is likely that the actual percentage of the Javanese within the Malay population was much higher. An ethnographic study in 1990 estimated that approximately 50–60% of Singaporean Malays have at least some degree of Javanese ancestry. The Javanese came to Singapore in stages. In the mid-19th century, they came and worked as ironsmiths, leather makers as well as spice merchants and religious books dealers. There were also a group of Javanese printers and publishers in the Arab Street area. There were also a community of pilgrim brokers that played an important role in encouraging the migration of the Javanese to Singapore. There are many Singapore's area and neighborhoods that has Javanese names such as Kampong Java, Radin Mas, Kampong Pachitan, Kampong Wak Hassan, Kampong Kembangan, and others.

The political situation in the Dutch East Indies created by the Dutch government caused many Javanese to go through Singapore to travel to Mecca to perform the Hajj. From the mid-19th century until 1910, between 2,000 and 7,000 Javanese travelled to Mecca through Singapore until the regulations were eased (Roff 1967:39). Usually, these pilgrims would work in Singapore for several months or years before or after performing the hajj to earn money or pay their debts to their pilgrim brokers. Many of them stayed in Singapore and became part of the Muslim community in the city (Roff, 1967:43).

A number of Javanese also came to Singapore with the help of the pilgrim brokers. They came voluntarily and a majority of them were young men who stayed in the lodgings of the pilgrim brokers until they found work. They worked as food sellers, gardeners and provided labour for the pilgrim brokers to build lodging homes for them. The pilgrim brokers also took in bonded labourers who worked for Malay or Javanese employers to clear forests to set up settlements in Johore, Malaya (Roff, 1967:37). The activities with these bonded labourers continued until the 1920s. From 1886 till 1890, as many as 21,000 Javanese became bonded labourers with the Singapore Chinese Protectorate, an organisation formed by the British in 1877 to monitor the Chinese population. They performed manual labour in the rubber plantations. After their bond ended, they continued to open up the land and stayed on in Johore.

After the Second World War, the total number of Javanese coming to Singapore continued to increase. The first wave consisted of conscript labour that was brought by the Japanese and their numbers were estimated to be about 10,000 (Turnbull, 1976:216). The second wave were those who moved to Singapore through Malaya. The 1970 Population Census showed that a total of 21,324 Malays who were born in Malaya (later Malaysia) had moved to Singapore in the years 1946–1955, and as many as 29,679 moved to Singapore from 1956–1970 (Census 1970:262-3). Interviews conducted showed that a majority of them were young men of Javanese descent from Johore who wanted to find a better life in Singapore. Most of them were not educated and not highly skilled and worked as manual labourers in the post-war years.

In the 2010 census, Malays of Javanese descent numbered 89,000.

The Baweanese/Boyanese
The Baweanese or Boyanese originally came from the Bawean Island in the Dutch East Indies (Indonesia now). They built the Kampung Boyan (Boyanese Village) by the banks of the Rochor River, between Jalan Besar and Syed Alwi Road since the time of Munshi Abdullah. Most of them came to Singapore in the late 19th century until the end of Second World War. The majority of them worked as horse cart drivers and later as motorcar drivers. They could not be considered poor as their lands in Bawean were fertile; they had come in search of cash earnings. They wanted to purchase jewellery made of gold and goods that they could bring back to their villages. Some also wanted to build a better life for themselves in Singapore.

Most of them were young men who came and supported themselves, living in communal houses. There were several such houses built in Singapore. They were found in places like Adam Communal House in Ann Siang Hill, Teluk Dalam Communal House in Dixon Road and Dedawang Communal House in Sophie Road. There was also a village within the town area that was inhabited by the Baweanese called Kampung Kapur (literally 'Lime Village') in the western part of Kampung Boyan (Boyan Village). A mosque called the Masjid Bawean Kampung Kapur (Bawean Mosque of Lime Village) located at Weld Road was built in 1932. There was also a communal house that became the gathering point for writers and their friends from the literary group called Jejak Kembara (literally 'Wanderers' Steps') in the late 1970s.

Due to the fact that they shared the same religion and were closely related racially, both the Baweanese and the Javanese were able to mix freely and even intermarried with the Malays. In time, this caused the differences between them to be less obvious and more Baweanese and Javanese began identifying themselves as Malays.

The Bugis

The Bugis came from Sulawesi Island in Indonesia. They were well known for a long time as maritime traders. In the mid-seventeenth century, the Bugis were spreading out from Celebes to set up trading centres throughout the region. Often they had to sail to distant lands and fight indigenous tribes. They rarely lost and acquired a reputation as fierce warriors.

The Dutch control of the Dutch East Indies and their blockades cut off the Bugis from their traditional spice trade routes from Celebes to Java. This forced them to migrate to other areas to continue trading. Their migration to what is today Malaysia and Riau Archipelago began around the 18th century or even earlier. Their influence in Riau was strong. Among the Bugis traders were also members of the nobility like Engku Karaeng Talibak who married the daughter of Raja Ali Haji. According to Raja Ali Haji in his work, Tuhfat al-Nafis, the presence of Karaeng Talibak brought more Bugis traders to Riau.

In 1819, conflicts between the Dutch and Bugis result in a number of Bugis leaving Riau, and soon after Raffles arrival to Singapore, a group of 500 Bugis led by Chieftain Arong Bilawa fled to Singapore. By the time of the first census in 1824, there were 1,951 Bugis recorded in Singapore, over 18% of the island's population of 10,683.  The establishment of a free port in Singapore allowed the Bugis to expand their network in the archipelago. Sailing from Sumatra to north Australia, the Bugis ships brought cargoes of cotton cloth, gold dust, birds-of-paradise feathers, pepper, trepang (sea slugs), sandalwood, tortoiseshell, coffee, and rice to Singapore. Most of these goods were very much in demand by the Chinese merchants in Singapore. The Bugis also traded in slaves.

James Cameron gave a description in 1865 of the various ships that would visit Singapore's harbour. According to him, each year during October and November, the Bugis ships would come from Bali and the Celebes.

By the 1830s, the Bugis had established themselves in Singapore and formed the majority of the pioneer communities in the Kampung Gelam area. By 1831, the Census of Population reported over 2,000 Bugis in Singapore. The Bugis gradually formed kampongs and settlements in places like Kampung Bugis (around the Kallang River), Kampung Soopoo, Jalan Pelatok and Jalan Pergam. The number of Bugis however would decline as they lost their dominance in the sea trade, and by 1860, there were only about 900 Bugis left in Singapore.  Many of them also became assimilated into the larger Malay community. Many Bugis pioneers and historical figures are buried in Jalan Kubor Cemetery.

The Minangkabaus
The Minangkabau people came from Western Sumatra. The Minangkabaus are known for their matrilineal social system and their tradition for travelling. The Minangkabaus would leave their homes and travel in search of work, knowledge and experience. They would usually return home once they had fulfilled their objective. This tradition of travelling was a rite of passage for the young Minangkabau men and was considered a way for them to be in touch with the outside world.

The Minangkabaus have been migrating to Malaysia and Singapore since long ago. This only stopped when Malaya achieved independence from the British in 1957, when the immigration laws were tightened. The majority of Minangkabaus who came to Singapore came from Pariaman and Agam in Western Sumatra. The majority of them were engaged in business. The Minangkabaus also sold religious items, toys and clothes. They had shops in Arab Street and Geylang. The Minangkabaus even formed an association at one time but this was subsequently banned during the 1962–66 Indonesia-Malaysia confrontation.

After Singapore became an independent state in 1965, the majority of Minangkabaus either migrated to Malaysia or returned to Sumatra. Those who stayed in Singapore assimilated into the Malay community. Not many Minangkabaus brought their wives or women with them to Singapore. As such, many married the local Malay women and did not maintain strong ties with the other Minangkabau communities. By 1973, it was estimated that there were 200 Minangkabaus family in Singapore and almost all of them were Singapore citizens.

The Banjar
The Banjar people originated from the southern and eastern coast of Kalimantan in Borneo. Most came from Banjarmasin in the area surrounding the Barito basin. These areas were used for the cultivation of paddy. The Banjarese who migrated to the Malay Peninsula were farmers who were experienced in paddy cultivation. They also migrated to spread Islam to the region, to escape poverty and the oppressive Dutch rule of their homeland. Some also wanted to escape the presence of wild animals that threatened their farms in Kalimantan.

The Banjarese generally did not like to be employees. They preferred to be self-employed, working as either farmers or businessmen. The Banjar were also well known as jewel cutters and dealers in the region. Many came to Singapore to deal in the jewellery trade and had their shops in Arab Street. They even formed a Kalimantan Association in Singapore.

The Banjarese made up a very small percentage of the Malay population in Singapore. In 1931, they numbered 445 out of a total Malay population of 65,104 (0.7%). In 1947, they formed only 0.3% of the population. This dropped to 0.2% in 1957 and 0.1% in 1970. By 1980 and 1990, the total numbers could not be determined, probably because the Banjarese have effectively assimilated into the Malay community.

The Batak
The Batak people are the smallest Malay group in Singapore. Up till 1978, there were less than 350 Bataks in Singapore. Unlike other Malay groups that are predominantly Muslim, the Batak are largely Christians (Seventh-day Adventists, Lutherans, Jehovah's Witnesses).

The Batak had been coming to Singapore before the 20th century. Not much is known about the Bataks that came to Singapore in the 19th century and before World War 2. Most were young men in their twenties who were from the Toba, Mandailing and Angkola people.
The Bataks came to Singapore for economic, educational and social reasons. Most of those who came to Singapore before the War had received their primary education in the Batak and Malay language. Some came to Singapore to continue their education in the private and Christian schools. For example, the Seventh-day Adventist organisation had students' amenities in Singapore in 1915 and they encouraged the Bataks from Sipirok, Angkola and Pematang Siantar in Sumatra to send their children to continue their studies in Singapore. An English education was prized as it was seen as a passport to getting a white-collar job in the plantations in Eastern Sumatra that were owned by the Dutch and the Americans. After receiving their education in Singapore, the Bataks would return to their homeland. Some would marry and bring their wives to Singapore. The Batak Christians were the first Bataks to bring their wives to Singapore.

Most of the Bataks who came before World War 2 worked as gardeners, peons and manual labourers. During the Japanese Occupation, the Bataks were conscripted as foot soldiers or forced labourers by the Japanese. Some were sent to Singapore for military training. After the War, many of the Bataks returned home. At the same time, many others came to Singapore from places like Medan, Palembang and the Riau Islands. Some managed to find work as clerks, storekeepers and some started businesses with non-Bataks partners. Some also joined the British army as soldiers, technicians and electricians. Others started identifying themselves as Malays so that they could join the military or get jobs given to local Malays.

In 1947, the Bataks in Singapore formed a welfare organisation called Saroha ("one heart" in the Batak language). The aim of the organisation was to help the Bataks in Singapore. The organisation lasted until 1954 and was disbanded due to leadership problems and a lack of support from its members. Attempts to revive it later in 1958 proved futile.

There were Bataks who took Malay wives and converted to Islam. The majority of them and their descendants were assimilated into the Malay community and preferred to be known as Malays.

Ethnic composition of Malay population 1931–1990
The following figures show the composition of the various Malay ethnic population in Singapore for the past 60 years. The great increase shown in the other Malay groups, especially the Javanese, in 1990 is likely due to the increase in the employment of Indonesian domestic workers in Singapore.

(Reference: Arumainathan 1973, Vol 1:254; Pang, 1984, Appendix m; Sunday Times, 28 June 1992)

Culture

The majority of Malays in Singapore generally share a similar culture with those in Peninsular Malaysia. Many aspects of Singaporean Malay culture includes:

Cuisine
There is several major local Malay foods that was famous among the community. It includes:
Sup Tulang Merah
Mee Rebus
Bihun Singapura
Epok-Epok (Curry Puff)

At the same time, there is also several major non-Malay cuisines that is predominantly popular among the Malay/Muslim community as it is not only delicious, but also certified as Halal. Most of the cuisines are predominantly refers to Middle Eastern (Arab) cuisine, (southern) Indian cuisine, south Korean cuisine etc.
Nasi Arab (Mandi Rice)
Rojak India
Thosai
Vadai
Kimchi
Bulgogi
Kek Lapis (Layer Cake)
Mee kolok (beef and/or chicken only)

Dialects and languages

Malay language is the national language of Singapore and one of its official languages. It is written in a Roman script known as Rumi. It is the home language of 13% of the Singaporean population. Malay is also the ceremonial national language and used in the national anthem of Singapore, in citations for Singapore orders and decorations and military foot drill commands, mottos of several organisations, and is the variety taught in Singapore's language education system.

Linguistically, most Malays in Singapore speak the Johore-Riau dialect of Malay that is similar to that spoken in the southern part of west Malaysian peninsular and the Riau islands of Indonesia. Some of the older generation who migrated here or whose parents were immigrants can speak Javanese. Other ethnoliguistic languages that was exist among Singaporean Malays includes Javanese, Bawean, Buginese, Banjarese, Minangkabau and Batak. Almost all older generation are familiar with these languages. However, most of the Malays here especially the younger generation do not speak that kind of languages of their ancestors from Indonesia.

Prior to independence, Singapore was a centre for Malay literature and Malay culture. However, after independence, this cultural role declined. Singapore is an observer to the Language Council for Brunei Darussalam-Indonesia-Malaysia which works to standardise Malay spelling, however it has not applied to be a member. It nonetheless applies standardisations agreed to in this forum, and follows the Malaysian standard when there are disagreements. Standards within the country are set by the Malay Language Council of Singapore. There are some differences between the official standard and colloquial usage. While the historical standard was the Johor-Riau dialect, a new standard known as sebutan baku (or bahasa melayu baku) was adopted in 1956 by the Third Malay language and Literary Congress. This variation was chosen to create consistency between the written word and the spoken pronunciation. However, implementation was slow, with Malaysia only fully adopting it in the educational system in 1988, with Singapore introducing it at the primary school level in 1993. Despite expanding use in formal education, it has not replaced the Johor-Riau pronunciation for most speakers. The artificial creation of the accent means there are no truly native speakers, and the pronunciation is closer to Indonesian than it is to Johor-Riau. There has also been cultural resistance, with accent differences between older and younger generations leading to questions surrounding Malay cultural identity. This question was further sharpened by Malaysia dropping sebutan baku in 2000, returning to the traditional use of Johor-Riau.

English is also widely spoken. Arabic is more common among the Muslim religious teachers or locally known as Asatizahs, and is the preferred language learned by the more religious Malay/Muslims.

Holidays and festivities

Some of the major Muslim festivals celebrated every year among the Singapore's Malay/Muslim community include Hari Raya Aidilfitri, Hari Raya Haji, Maal Hijrah and Maulidur Rasul, with the minor festivals includes Israk & Mikraj, Awal Ramadhan, Nuzul Alquran and Arafah Day. It is just as similar as their Muslim neighbour countries that was celebrated in Malaysia, Indonesia and Brunei Darussalam. However, only Hari Raya Aidilfitri and Hari Raya Haji is recognised and gazetted as Muslim religious public holiday in Singapore despite the significant presence of Malay/Muslim community as indigenous in the country. Previously, Maulidur Rasul (birthday of Prophet Mohamed) has been recognised as public holiday prior to 1968 amendment of the 1966 Holidays Act, where since that two public holidays were designated each for both Muslim and Christian as well as one for Hindu community. It is implemented in purpose to improve business competitiveness and valid until now.

Prior to the fasting month of Ramadan and Syawal, most Malay/Muslim settlements and streets will decorated with green-based or colourful decoration of Eid such as lights, Ketupat, pelita api (fire lamp) and many more, with most of them centered in Geylang Serai as the main Malay settlement area in Singapore. During the fasting month, Bazar Ramadhan (Ramadan bazaar(s)) are the most famous events during the holy month where it provides diverse foods and beverages (F&B). The popular F&Bs includes Mee Rebus, Air Kathira, Roti John, Nasi Arab, Vadai etc. While moving to the month of Syawal, almost all Malay/Muslim families and organisations will hold Rumah Terbuka Aidilfitri (Eid openhouse(s)), where all communities regardless of ethnics and religions are not only having a chance to meet and greet their Muslim friends and relatives, but at the same time they are also invited to a variety of dishes that are commonly served during Aidilfitri. The Aidilfitri popular dishes in Singapore are relatively similar to Malaysia, Indonesia and Brunei Darussalam such as Rendang, Lemang and Ketupat, as well as the famous layer cakes from Sarawak, Kek Lapis which is predominantly provided during the sole-month Aidilfitri season.

Religion

According to the latest 2020 Census, almost 99% of Singapore's Malay population are predominantly declared themselves as Muslims, including the small populations of 0.4% non-religious and 0.8% other religions, as stated in the following statistics.

An overwhelming majority of Malays in Singapore are predominantly the followers of Sunni Islam, belonging to the Shāfi'ī (شافعي) school of thought.

A very small Christian community also exists among the local Malays, with approximately 0.6% of Malays are Christians. There is also a small Buddhist community, mostly consisting of Malays with mixed Chinese or Peranakan ancestry and even there are Hindu minorities, mostly among the Malays with mixed Indian (Tamil) or Chitty ancestry or those who are Balinese origin spite there is no Balinese Hindu temple in Singapore, the Balinese Hindu communities in Singapore often adopted local existing Indian cultural influences or visit local Hindu temples run by larger Indian Hindu communities otherwise practiced their own beliefs at home.

Status of Malays in Singapore
Malays are recognised and considered as the indigenous people of Singapore by the Singapore Constitution, Part XIII, General Provisions, Minorities and special position of Malays, section 152:

The Government shall exercise its functions in such manner as to recognise the special position of the Malays, who are the indigenous people of Singapore, and accordingly it shall be the responsibility of the Government to protect, safeguard, support, foster and promote their political, educational, religious, economic, social and cultural interests and the Malay language.

Notable Malay Singaporeans

For Malays in Singapore, the last name is patronymic, not a family name. The person should be referred to by his or her first or second name which is the given name. The Malay word bin (b.) or binte (bte.), if used, means "son of" or "daughter of" respectively.

See also
 Overseas Indonesians
 Pertubuhan Kebangsaan Melayu Singapura

References

Further reading
 Dr Syed Farid Alatas, Keadaan Sosiologi Masyarakat Melayu, Occasional Paper Series Paper No.5-97, Association of Muslim Professionals Singapore, 1997
 Dr Syed Hussein Alatas, Prof Khoo Kay Kim & Kwa Chong Guan, Malays/Muslims and the History of Singapore, Occasional Paper Series Paper No.1-98, Centre for Research on Islamic & Malay Affairs, Association of Muslim Professionals Singapore, 1997
 Brown, C.C, Sejarah Melayu or Malay Annals: a translation of Raffles MS 18, Journal of the Malayan Branch of the Royal Asiatic Society, Volume 25, No. 2 & 3, 1952
 Chia Jeannette Hwee Hwee, A History of Javanese and Baweanese of Singapore, Department of History, Thesis for the BA of Arts and Social Sciences, 1993
 Djamour, Judith Malay Kinship and Marriage in Singapore, London: Athlone Press, 1965
 Gibson-Hill, C. A., he Orang Laut Of The Singapore River and the Sampan Panjang, Singapore: Malayan Branch, Royal Asiatic Society, 1952.
 Hadijah Rahmat, Kilat Senja: Sejarah Sosial dan Budaya Kampung-Kampung di Singapura, H S Yang Publishing Pte Ltd, Singapore, 2005.
 Haffidz A. Hamid, Mohd Azhar Khalid, Mohd Alami Musa & Yusof Sulaiman, Factors Affecting Malays/Muslim Pupils' Performance in Education, Occasional Paper Series Paper No.1-95, Centre for Research on Islamic & Malay Affairs, Association of Muslim Professionals Singapore, 1995
 Dr Khoo Kay Kim, Elinah Abdullah, Wan Meng Hao (ed.), Malays/Muslims in Singapore: Selected Readings in History 1819–1965, Centre for Research on Islamic & Malay Affairs, Association of Muslim Professionals Singapore, 2006
 Li Tania, Malays in Singapore: Culture, Community and Ideology, Oxford University Press, Singapore, 1989
 Lily Zubaidah Rahim, The Singapore Dilemma: The Political and Educational Marginality of the Malay Community, Oxford University Press, New York, 1998
 Mohamed Pitchay Gani Bin Mohamed Abdul Aziz, Leksikon: Direktori Penulis Melayu Singapura Pasca 1965, Angkatan Sasterawan '50, Singapore, 2005.
 Pang Keng Fong, The Malay Royals of Singapore, Department of Sociology, Thesis for the BA of Social Science, 1984
 Parliamentary Debates of Singapore, Sultan Hussain Ordinance/Kampong Glam Conservation, Volume 57(7), Tuesday 12 March 1991
 Perkins, Jane, Kampong Glam: Spirit of a Community, Singapore, Times Publishing, 1984
 Tengku Mahmud vs. Tengku Ali, Straits Settlements Laws Report 1897 (Vol. 5)
 Tham Seong Chee, Malay Family Structure: Change and Opportunity with reference to Singapore, Seminar Paper No. 13, Academic Session 1993/94, Department of Malay Studies, National University of Singapore
 Zarinah Binte Ali, The Istana at Kampong Gelam: From Royal Ground to National Heritage, Department of Southeast Asian Studies Programme, Thesis for the BA of Arts, 2001/2002

External links

The Singapore Constitution
Minorities at Risk (MAR) Project Chronology for Malays in Singapore
Malay Heritage Centre
Asas 50
Year 2010 Census Report Singapore:Key Population Indicators
Year 2010 Census Report:Key Indicators of Resident Population
Report on religion in Singapore by Exploitz.com, a public domain information from the US State Department Country Guide
Singapore Book of Records
Demographic Characteristics- Table 5
1820 - Arrivals from Riau - a short documentary about the Bugis community in Singapore, produced for the Singapore Bicentennial in 2019.

Malay people
Ethnic groups in Singapore
Indonesian diaspora in Singapore
 
Indigenous peoples of Southeast Asia